Synamedia Ltd. (previously  Cisco's SPVSS business, and formerly NDS Group Ltd., and later Cisco Videoscape) is a video technology provider headquartered in Staines-upon-Thames, UK. Its products cover content distribution and delivery, video processing, advanced advertising, broadband solutions, and video security.

History 
The company was formed in 1988 as News Datacom in Israel, offering encryption technology for satellite broadcasts. The encryption technology was developed by Israeli cryptographer Adi Shamir and Amos Fiat. In 1992, the company was acquired by News Corporation and renamed News Digital Systems (NDS). In 2012, Cisco Systems Inc. acquired NDS. It became the foundation of Cisco's Service Provider Video Software Solutions (SPVSS) business. In May 2018, Permira acquired the SPVSS business from Cisco. The acquisition included Cisco's Infinite Video platform, the former Scientific Atlanta video processing portfolio, cloud digital video recording, video processing, video security, and video middleware. In October 2018, the business was launched as Synamedia.

Synamedia leadership includes Paul Segre, CEO; Bijal Patel, CFO; Nick Thexton, CTO; Yael Fainaro, EVP of Security; Jean-Francois Pigeon, EVP of Sales & Marketing and Julien Signes, EVP and General Manager, Video Network. The company has offices in the U.K., U.S., Canada, Belgium, Israel, India, and China.

Synamedia's clients include satellite and cable pay TV providers, media companies, and others involved in direct-to-consumer OTT distribution. It has over 200 pay TV and media customers. They include Astro, AT&T, beIN, Bharti Airtel, Charter, Comcast, Cox, Disney, Etisalat, Foxtel, Liberty Global, OSN, Rogers, Sky, Tata Sky, Verizon, Vodafone, and YES.

In January 2020, Synamedia entered a partnership with Pearl TV to join the Phoenix Model Market Initiative.

In August 2021, Synamedia acquired ContentArmor, a company that develops forensic watermarking solutions for the media and entertainment industry.

In May 2022, it was announced that Synamedia had acquired the UK-headquartered TV and OTT content discovery SaaS platform, Utelly. In July 2022, Synamedia acquired Quortex, a cloud-based streaming video processing provider.

Products 
Synamedia's platforms for cable, satellite, and IPTV include Foundation for broadcast and hybrid solutions, and the cloud-based Infinite platform. In September 2021, Synamedia announced pre-integrated security and business solutions support for Android TV on its Infinite platform.

In 2019, Synamedia released its Credentials Sharing and Fraud Insight product. The product enables pay TV partners and OTT companies to track and prevent piracy and password-sharing.

In April 2021, Synamedia announced Gravity, a managed service that offers broadband and video capabilities to operators and service providers for their small to medium business (SMB) and residential customers.

At the end of 2020, Synamedia worked alongside THEO Technologies to advance the already existent High Efficiency Streaming Protocol (HESP) . They did so by founding the HESP Alliance. This alliance intended to enhance the modern streaming landscape, by bringing video vendors and media companies together, in order to provide a scalable solution for ultra-low latency. 

The Synamedia Video Network portfolio includes Digital Content Manager (DCM) which transitions distribution architectures to an IP-based virtualized video processing environment. In May 2020, Synamedia launched a ATSC 3.0 Receiver which can function as both an RF and IP receiver. The receiver is in use today with Fox Television Stations in Orlando, FL.

In October 2019, Discovery began using the DCM platform. The Synamedia virtualized DCM with Smart Rate Control and Automation provides bandwidth distribution, storage capabilities and High Definition viewing experiences for live and time-shifted ABR streaming. The Synamedia Video Network Service Manager is a micro-services-based platform that helps operators and video producers quickly update their programming line-ups and bundled offers. The Converged Headend is designed to help pay-TV providers transition to software-based services, and can be deployed on premise, in the cloud, or in a hybrid environment.

In April 2021, Synamedia released Clarissa, which analyzes critical behavioral and consumption insights for pay-TV and OTT services. Synamedia Iris, an addressable advertising for broadcast, IP, OTT and Hybrid, was announced in August 2020.

Synamedia, in partnership with Sky, has developed a personalized ad targeting platform, AdSmart, which serves TV advertisements to households based on their profiles.

References 

Digital television
Digital Video Broadcasting
Mass media companies of the United Kingdom
Permira companies
Mass media companies established in 1988
1988 establishments in Israel